This is the discography of American R&B/soul singer Teddy Pendergrass.

Albums

Studio albums

Live albums

Compilation albums

Singles

References

Discographies of American artists
Rhythm and blues discographies
Soul music discographies